"Life for Rent" is the title track from English singer Dido's second studio album, Life for Rent (2003). The song was released as a single on 1 December 2003 and peaked at number eight on the UK Singles Chart. The song also became a top-40 hit in several other countries, including Hungary, Ireland, Italy, and the Netherlands. The music video, directed by Sophie Muller, shows Dido in several rooms in a house.

Track listings
UK CD1
 "Life For Rent" – 3:41
 "White Flag" (Idjut Boys remix) – 3:45

UK CD2 and Australian CD single
 "Life dor Rent"
 "Life for Rent" (Skinny 4 Rent mix)
 "Stoned" (Spiritchaser mix)
 "Life for Rent" (video)

Credits and personnel
Credits are lifted from the UK CD2 liner notes and the Life for Rent booklet.

Studios
 Recorded at The Ark  (Lincolnshire, England), The Church, Wessex Studios (London, England), and Cubejam (Miami, Florida, US)
 Mixed at The Church (London, England)
 Strings recorded at Angel Recording Studios (London, England)
 Mastered at Metropolis Studios (London, England)

Personnel

 Dido – writing (as Dido Armstrong), vocals, guitar, production
 Rollo – writing (as Rollo Armstrong), production
 Paul Herman – guitar
 Dave Randall – additional guitars
 Aubrey Nunn – bass
 Mark Bates – piano, keyboards, programming
 Andy Treacey – live drums
 P*Nut – drum programming
 Ash Howes – mixing, recording
 Phill Brown – recording
 Nick Ingman – string arrangement
 Gavyn Wright – concertmaster
 Miles Showell – mastering
 Simon Corkin – artwork design
 Ellen Von Unwerth – photography

Charts

Weekly charts

Year-end charts

Certifications

References

2003 singles
2003 songs
Dido (singer) songs
Music videos directed by Sophie Muller
Song recordings produced by Dido (singer)
Song recordings produced by Rollo Armstrong
Songs written by Dido (singer)
Songs written by Rollo Armstrong